Anolis purpurescens, the purple anole, is a species of lizard in the family Dactyloidae. The species is found in Ecuador, Colombia, Panama, and Costa Rica.

References

Anoles
Reptiles of Ecuador
Reptiles of Colombia
Reptiles of Panama
Reptiles of Costa Rica
Reptiles described in 1899
Taxa named by Edward Drinker Cope